Abdelaziz Meziane Belfqih (1944–9 May 2010) was a Moroccan civil servant and senior advisor of king Mohammed VI.

References

People from Taourirt, Morocco
Moroccan civil servants
Advisors of Mohammed VI of Morocco
Advisors to Hassan II of Morocco
2010 deaths
1944 births
Moroccan engineers
École des Ponts ParisTech alumni
Moroccan expatriates in France
Mines Paris - PSL alumni